HD 216718 is a binary star system in the equatorial constellation of Aquarius.

References

Aquarius (constellation)
216718
Binary stars
K-type subgiants
8716
Durchmusterung objects
113184